Matthew Young (born 17 July 1981) is a former Australian male volleyball player. He was part of the Australia men's national volleyball team. He competed with the national team at the 2004 Summer Olympics in Athens, Greece. He played with Jusam-Electronics in 2004.

Clubs
  Jusam-Electronics (2004)

See also
 Australia at the 2004 Summer Olympics

References

External links
 

1981 births
Living people
Australian men's volleyball players
Place of birth missing (living people)
Volleyball players at the 2004 Summer Olympics
Olympic volleyball players of Australia